Paduka Sri Sultan Mahmud Shah I (died 1630) was the eighth Sultan of Perak. He was the brother of sixth Sultan of Perak, Mukaddam Shah.

In 1627, Raja Yusuf or Raja Bongsu who is the younger brother of the late Sultan Mukaddam Shah (6th Sultan of Perak) was appointed as the 8th sultan of Perak. Iskandar Muda who was the Sultan of Aceh at that time appointed Raja Yusuf as the Sultan of Perak to replace Sultan Mansur Shah II.

Raja Yusuf used the title of Sultan Mahmud Shah when holding the throne of the Perak Sultanate and ruled the Perak for 3 years from 1627 to 1630.

It is said that Sultan Mahmud Shah's residence during his reign was located in the Geronggong area which is close to Kampung Gajah.

His Majesty Sultan Mahmud Shah died in 1630 and was buried on the banks of the Perak river, Kampung Tok Melor. After almost 300 years, his majesty Sultan Mahmud Shah's tomb has been moved from its original location. This is because the original location of Sultan Mahmud Shah's tomb is located so close to the Perak River that it almost sank into the river. Therefore, the tomb of Sultan Mahmud Shah was moved to Kampung Melayu. Now the location of the tomb of Sultan Mahmud Shah is located in Pulau Tiga, the same area as the tomb of Sultan Muhammad Shah (the 14th Sultan of Perak).

There is not much information available regarding the story of Sultan Mahmud Shah (8th Sultan of Perak). The limited record of narration is a constraint for today's generation to know the true story that happened at one time in the past.

He had a son named Raja Kobat, who would later be known as Sultan Salehuddin which succeeded him after his death.

References 

Sultans of Perak
1630 deaths
Royal House of Perak
Malay people
People of Malay descent
Muslim monarchs
Sultans
Sunni monarchs
People from Perak